The Hip Hop Years is a three part series of one hour television documentaries, made for Channel 4 in 1999. It was accompanied by a book and compilation CD.

Media
The series was devised by David Upshal who produced, directed and narrated the series. The series charts the definitive story of Hip Hop, rising from the streets of the Bronx to become, what Upshal calls, "the new Rock'n'Roll". The programmes combine archive clips and performance from TV, movies and music videos with specially shot material and interviews with key players.

Contributors include Chuck D and Hank Shocklee from Public Enemy, Darryl McDaniels from Run-D.M.C., Rza from The Wu Tang Clan, Ice-T,  Eminem, Vanilla Ice, MC Hammer, Ice Cube, Tom Silverman, Russell Simmons, Rick Rubin, Fab Five Freddy, Afrika Bambaataa, Melle Mel, Grandmaster Flash and Kool DJ Herc.

Programme One - Close To The Edge
Programme Two - The New Rock'n'Roll
Programme Three - Hip Hop Nation

He also produced the 33-track compilation CD  which accompanied the series and co-wrote the book with Alex Ogg, also titled The Hip Hop Years.

The Hip Hop Years: A History of Rap by Alex Ogg, David Upshal (1999, Fromm International)

Reception
It was nominated for the BAFTA Hew Wheldon Award for Best Arts Programme in 2000.

References

External links
Link to the films

1999 British television series debuts
1999 British television series endings
1990s British music television series
Channel 4 original programming
British television documentaries
Documentary television series about music
Documentary films about hip hop music and musicians
British television miniseries
English-language television shows